Stanley Boxer (1926-May 8, 2000) was an American artist best known for thickly painted abstract works of art. He was also an accomplished sculptor and printmaker. He received awards from the Guggenheim Fellowship and the National Endowment for the Arts.

Career
Boxer was born in New York City, and began his formal education after World War II, when he left the Navy and studied at the Art Students League of New York. He drew, painted, made prints, and sculpted. His work was recognized by art critic Clement Greenberg, who categorized him as a color field painter, a designation which Boxer rejected. Art critic Grace Glueck wrote "Never part of a movement or trend, though obviously steeped in the language of Modernism, the abstract painter Stanley Boxer was a superb manipulator of surfaces, intensely bonding texture and color."

Boxer offered an explanation of his philosophy and working process:

In 1953 Boxer had his first solo exhibition of paintings in New York City, and showed regularly thereafter until his death. His paintings and sculpture were represented in New York City during the late 1960s through 1974 by the Tibor de Nagy Gallery, then by the André Emmerich Gallery from 1975 until 1993, and finally  by Salander-O'Reilly Galleries until its demise in 2007 .

Richard Waller, director of the University of Richmond's Harnett Museum of Art, describes his evolution as an artist:

Museums

One-man museum exhibitions were held at the Rose Art Museum and the Butler Institute of American Art. His work is included in the permanent collections of numerous museums, including the Metropolitan Museum of Art, the Tate Gallery, the Museum of Modern Art and the Whitney Museum of American Art in New York, the Hirshhorn Museum in Washington, and the Boston Museum of Fine Art.

Honors

Boxer received a Guggenheim Fellowship in 1975 and a National Endowment for the Arts Visual Artists Fellowship Grant in 1989. In 1993 he was elected as a full member to the National Academy of Design.

Death

Boxer died May 8, 2000 in Pittsfield, Massachusetts. He was 73 years old. According to Boxer's wife of 49 years, the artist Joyce Weinstein, Boxer created more than 7,000 drawings, paintings, and sculptures, about 700 of which were part of his estate at the time of his death.

Notes

References
 
  Quoted from The New York Times, April 23, 2004.

External links
 
 Stanley Boxer timeline

1926 births
2000 deaths
20th-century American painters
American male painters
Art Students League of New York alumni
Painters from New York City
National Academy of Design members
People from New York City
20th-century American sculptors
American male sculptors
20th-century American printmakers
Sculptors from New York (state)
20th-century American male artists